Roseibium album is a bacterium from the genus of Roseibium which has been isolated from an oyster from Valencia in Spain.

References 

Rhodobacteraceae
Bacteria described in 2006